Aiphanes bicornis is a species of small, pinnately leaved palm which is endemic to Ecuador.  First described in 2004 and known from only two locations, the species name refers to the deeply notched tips of its leaflets, which resemble a pair of horns.

Description
Individuals have between 7 and 13 leaves which consists of a leaf sheath, a petiole and a rachis.

The rachis bears 2 to 3 rachillae, which are the smaller branches which themselves bear the flowers. The male flowers have purple sepals and cream-coloured petals, while the female flowers are purple.

Taxonomy
Aiphanes has been placed in the subfamily Arecoideae, the tribe Cocoseae and the subtribe Bactridinae, together with Desmoncus, Bactris, Acrocomia and Astrocaryum.  Aiphanes bicornis was described by Ecuadorian botanists Carlos Cerón and Rodrigo Bernal in 2004 based on a collection made in 2003 by Cerón and others between 2000 and 2003.  While the species bears certain resemblance to other members of the genus, it position within Aiphanes is uncertain.

The specific name, bicornis refers to the deeply notched ends of the leaflets, which are said to be evocative of the horns of an antelope.

Distribution
Aiphanes bicornis is known from two locations at the base of the Cordillera de Toisan on the western slope of the Andes, in Imbabura Province, Ecuador.  The species may also be present in Colombia.

References

bicornis
Trees of Ecuador